The Utenos Alus Brewery is a Lithuanian brewery headquartered in Utena, Lithuania.

The Brewery is based near the Aukštaitija National Park. 

It is currently considered one of the Carlsberg Group breweries in Europe. In addition to making beer for Lithuanian consumers, it also makes products for international brands located in Scandinavia and northern Europe.

History 

In 1970, the decision was made to construct the most cutting-edge brewery in the area. Because of its pristine surroundings and plentiful supplies of water that are suited for brewing beer, Kloviniai in Utena was chosen as the brewery's location. Gediminas Jackeviius oversaw the building of the "Beer Complex of Utena," and he later became the brewery's first manager, serving in that capacity until his passing in 1993. The project was carried out with the aid of skilled builders from the Czech Republic's Techno Export Group. Brewing engineer Jerzy Tomáek, whose signature can be seen on the labels of Utenos Pilsener today, placed traditional copper boilers at the brewery.

Igulinis, the first beer produced by the Utenos Alus Brewery, was released on January 14th, 1977. The brewmasters of Utena swiftly improved their lager using the knowledge they obtained from working with the Czech experts, and it not only became a "default," but also helped spread the word about Utena. The Utenos Alus Brewery also bottled the renowned soft drinks of the time, including Citrina, Sajanai, Tarchnas, and Altukas.

Pepsi Cola and Coca-Cola are said to have competed for the right to make their brand of drinks in Utena.

In 1991, the Complex became public limited liability company Utenos Gėrimai to berestructured as Utenos Gėrimai AB (a company with share capital). After the restoration of Lithuania's independence, the Utenos Alus Brewery started making new types of beer. These include: Lietuviškas, Aukštaitijos, Studentiškas, Gaudeamus, Sartų, Bočių, Baltų, Utenos, Utenos Premium, GJ, Turbo beer and Porteris. The dark and heavy Porter beer in particular served to spread the fame of Utena all around the world: in 1992, it won its first silver medal in an exhibition abroad and received gold on many later occasions.

In 1997, Utenos Gėrimai AB started to cooperate with Baltic Beverages Holding (BBH), consisting of investors from Sweden, Norway and Finland. In 2001, BBH merged Švyturys and Utenos Alus into a company with share capital called Švyturys-Utenos Alus AB. Švyturys-Utenos Alus UAB has been part of the Carlsberg Group since 2008.

Statistics

In 2011, the Utenos Alus Brewery produced 102 million litres of beer and 31 million litres of other drinks. The beer brewed in Utena is exported to more than 20 countries worldwide and has received numerous diplomas and medals.

The brewery has implemented a quality and environmental management system based on two standards: the ISO 9001 standard for quality and the environmental ISO 14000 standard.

Production

 „Utenos Utenos“ (Pale Lager);
 „Utenos Auksinis Special“ (Premium Lager);
 „Utenos Auksinis“ (Premium Lager);
 „Utenos Pilsener“ (Pilsner);
 „Utenos Dark“ (Dunkel);
 „Utenos Porteris“ (Baltic Porter);
 „Utenos Kvietinis“;
 „Utenos Classic“;
 „Utenos Radler Cola“ (beer cocktail);
 „Utenos Radler Lemon“ (beer cocktail);
 „Utenos Radler Orange“ (beer cocktail);
 „D-Light“ (beer cocktail);
 „Kiss“, „Somersby“ (cider);
 „Vichy Classique“ (drinking water);
 „Vichy Fresh“ (soft drinks);
 „Vichy Classique Vivasport“ (soft drinks).

Key facts about Utenos Alus

 In 1970, the decision was taken to build the region's most modern brewery that would make the highest-quality products in Utena. Its construction and later the brewery itself were managed by Gediminas Jackevičius. The project was implemented with the help of experienced constructors from the TechnoExport Company of the Czech Republic. Traditional copper boilers were installed in the brewery by brewing engineer Jerzy Tomášek, whose signature today adorns the labels of Utenos Pilsener.
 In 1977, the Utenos Alus Brewery bottled its first batch of beer (Žigulinis).
 In 1980, the Utenos Alus Brewery supplied soft drinks for the Moscow Olympics.
 In 1985, the production facilities were renamed as the ‘Non-alcoholic Drinks Complex of Utena’.
 In 1992, the brewery was restructured asapublic limited liability company called Utenos Gėrimai, which later became a company with share capital. The company's modernisation also started that year.
 In 1992, Utenos Porteris won a silver medal in the competition for Baltic beers in St. Petersburg, Russia.
 In 1995, Utenos Porteris won a gold medal in the international Beer’96 competition in Minsk.
 In 1996, Utenos Porteris was awarded a gold medal in the Riga Beer’96 competition in Latvia.
 In 1997, Utenos Alus beer won a bronze medal in the Cheers Beer Festival in Florida (USA).
 In 1997, half the company's shares were acquired by Swedish-Norwegian-Finnish company Baltic Beverages Holding (BBH) and Estonian company Hansa Investments.
 In 1999, Utenos Alus beer won gold medals at the Agrobalt’99 exhibition and in the Lithuanian Product of the Year contest.
 In 2000, the company started producing Vichy Classique drinking water and Kiss cider; Utenos Alus beer was also renewed.
 In 2000, Utenos Porteris was awarded a gold medal in the Lithuanian Product of the Year contest.
 In 2001, the breweries of Švyturys and Utenos Alus were merged into Švyturys-Utenos Alus, with the Registered Office at Pramonės str. 12, Utena.
 In 2001, Utenos Porteris was awarded a gold medal by experts from the Chicago Beer Tasting Institute (USA).
 In 2004, Utenos Alus carried out the public campaign ‘Freedom for Joninės’. As a result, June 24 became a public holiday in Lithuania.
 In 2005, Utenos Utenos beer won bronze in the Australian International Beer Awards (AIBA).
 In 2007, Utenos Alus introduced the first beer in transparent bottles into the Lithuanian market.
 In 2007, Utenos Utenos beer in transparent bottles was awarded a silver medal in the Lithuanian Product of the Year contest.
 In 2008, the Utenos Alus Brewery became part of one of the biggest beer groups in the world, the Carlsberg Group.
 In 2008, Utenos ICE with its pull-off cap won gold in the Lithuanian Product of the Year contest.
 Every summer since 2009, the company has installed so-called ‘Eco-stops’ (rubbish-sorting centres intended for picnickers) in the country's Lake District (the districts of Utena, Molėtai, Ignalina and Zarasai).
 In 2011, Utenos Alus introduced the unique multilayer packaging that preserves the taste and quality of a beer right until its ‘best before’ date. The packaging won a gold medal in the Lithuanian Product of the Year contest.
 In the National Responsible Business Awards of 2011, the company received the Environmental Enterprise of the Year award for its ‘Lake District’ project.
 In 2014 Utenos Classic won 3 starts award in „iTQi Superior Taste Award“.

Social responsibility
Since 2006, Utenos Alus has sponsored numerous environmental initiatives: the company is involved in the maintenance of the banks of Lithuanian lakes and provides high-quality equipment to facilitate quality leisure at the most popular beaches. Since 2009, the company has also contributed to sorting out picnickers’ rubbish in the Lake District (the districts of Utena, Molėtai, Ignalina and Zarasai) by installing rubbish collection centres (so-called ‘Eco-stops’). In the National Responsible Business Awards of 2011, the company received the Environmental Enterprise of the Year award for its ‘Lake District’ project.

Utenos Alus is also an active participant in the city's community and cultural projects and is the long-term sponsor of Utena Juventus Basketball Club.

The Utenos Alus Brewery follows the international ISO 9001 standard, saving electrical and heating energy and other resources.

The Utenos Centre of Modern Brewery

In autumn 2012, the Modern Brewing Knowledge Centre opened its doors in the Utenos Alus Brewery and is dedicated to brewing achievements and history. It can be found at Pramonės str. 12, Utena.

References

External links
 Official website of Utenos Alus
Official website of Utenos vairavimo mokykla

Beer in Lithuania
Food and drink companies established in 1977
1977 establishments in Lithuania
Utena
Lithuanian brands
Beer brands
Drink companies of the Soviet Union
Food and drink companies of Lithuania